The 2016 Scottish Open Grand Prix was the 20th grand prix's badminton tournament of the 2016 BWF Grand Prix Gold and Grand Prix. The tournament was held at Emirates Arena in Glasgow, Scotland 23–27 November 2016 and had a total purse of $55,000.

Men's singles

Seeds

  Hsu Jen-hao (second round)
  Anders Antonsen (champion)
  Emil Holst (quarterfinals)
  Henri Hurskainen (semifinals)
  Raul Must (second round)
  Sourabh Varma (quarterfinals)
  Lucas Corvee (third round)
  Anand Pawar (first round)
 Lucas Claerbout (third round)
 Thomas Rouxel (first round)
 Niluka Karunaratne (withdrew)
 Kim Bruun (third round)
 Kieran Merrilees (third round)
 Luka Wraber (third round)
 Soong Joo Ven (final)
 Nick Fransman (third round)

Finals

Top half

Section 1

Section 2

Section 3

Section 4

Bottom half

Section 5

Section 6

Section 7

Section 8

Women's singles

Seeds

  Natalia Koch Rohde (quarterfinals)
  Delphine Lansac (withdrew)
  Mette Poulsen (champion)
  Tanvi Lad (first round)
 Mia Blichfeldt (semifinals)
 Sabrina Jaquet (final)
 Elisabeth Baldauf (quarterfinals)
 Julie Finne-Ipsen (semifinals)

Finals

Top half

Section 1

Section 2

Bottom half

Section 3

Section 4

Men's doubles

Seeds

 Mathias Christiansen / David Daugaard (champion) 
 Matijs Dierickx / Freek Golinski (first round)
 Raphael Beck / Peter Kaesbauer (first round)
 Liao Kuan-hao / Lu Chia-pin (semifinals)
 Akshay Dewalkar / Kona Tarun (first round)
 Joshua Magee / Sam Magee (quarterfinals)
 Jishnu Sanyal / Shivam Sharma (second round)
 Matthew Nottingham / Harley Towler (quarterfinals)

Finals

Top half

Section 1

Section 2

Bottom half

Section 3

Section 4

Women's doubles

Seeds

 Eefje Muskens / Selena Piek (withdrew)
 Setyana Mapasa / Gronya Somerville (first round)
 Maiken Fruergaard / Sara Thygesen (quarterfinals)
 Julie Finne-Ipsen / Rikke Søby Hansen (semifinals)

Finals

Top half

Section 1

Section 2

Bottom half

Section 3

Section 4

Mixed doubles

Seeds

  Pranaav Jerry Chopra / N. Sikki Reddy (final)
  Nico Ruponen / Amanda Hogstrom (withdrew)
  Sam Magee / Chloe Magee (second round)
  Sawan Serasinghe / Setyana Mapasa (first round)
 Ronan Labar / Audrey Fontaine (quarterfinals)
 Chang Ko-chi / Chang Hsin-tien (quarterfinals)
 Soren Gravholt / Maiken Fruergaard (first round)
 Ben Lane / Jessica Pugh (quarterfinals)

Finals

Top half

Section 1

Section 2

Bottom half

Section 3

Section 4

References

External links

Scottish Open (badminton)
BWF Grand Prix Gold and Grand Prix
Scottish Open Grand Prix
Scottish Open Grand Prix
Scottish Open Grand Prix